Masalit may refer to:
 Masalit people
 Masalit language

Language and nationality disambiguation pages